the Staley–Taylor Plan was the name of a plan to execute the "Special War" strategy of the United States during the Vietnam War. The plan was published in May 1961, named after two drafters: economist Eugene Staley of Stanford Research Institute - Stanford University and General Maxwell D. Taylor, commander of the U.S. military in Vietnam. According to the plan, it was to be implemented in four years (1961–1965). Its goal was to "pacify South Vietnam" within 18 months, thereby ensuring the Army of the Republic of Vietnam a proactive position on the battlefield in the South.

The plan included three strategic measures:

 Strengthening the Army of the Republic of Vietnam, using many aircraft and tanks to quickly destroy the armed forces of the Liberation Army, using American commanders and advisors to command combat units.
 Maintain the city, and at the same time extinguish the revolutionary movement in the countryside by "pacifying" and establishing "strategic hamlets".
 Trying to prevent the border from controlling the coast, cutting off aid from the North, isolating the Viet Cong.

However, it has been thwarted since 1963 with the events of the Battle of Ấp Bắc, the 1963 South Vietnamese coup, and the "strategic hamlets" could not be implemented as originally planned. Although undeclared, the plan officially ended when U.S. Marines landed in Da Nang in March 1965  to directly engage in combat in South Vietnam.

Formation 
In the 1960s, the United States implemented a policy of "flexibly reacting", not going to war with the Soviet Union and the socialist system, but using wars below the normal level to deal with the tendency to demand independence with different colors and communist identity in newly independent countries.

There was a new conception that was taking shape in the United States at the time, which was to see South Vietnam as the focal point of all American interests in Southeast Asia. Thus in 1961, American research delegations flocked to South Vietnam: U.S. Vice President Lyndon B. Johnson's delegation arrived in Saigon in May 1961, the delegation of economist Dr. Eugene Staley of the Stanford Research Institute arrived in Saigon in June 1961, the delegation of Maxwell D. Taylor and Walt Whitman Rostow of the U.S. Department of Defense to South Vietnam in October 1961. The South Vietnamese outcome would be where the typical war-type pilot of the "Flexible Response" global strategy was born.

The Staley–Taylor Plan published in May 1961 consisted of three phases:

 Phase 1 was implemented from mid–1961, the main goal was to pacify the South by means of strategic hamlets.
 Phase 2 was implemented from the beginning of 1963, restored the economy, strengthened the army, and completed the pacification.
 Phase 3 was implemented until the end of 1965, developing the economy, stabilizing the South and ending the war.

The opening and decisive plan is in Phase 1 with two strategic measures:

 Quickly increase the force and combat ability of the Army of the Republic of Vietnam; it was the backbone of the war according to the formula: ARVN + American weapons and equipment + American advisers.
 Implement the strategic hamlet national policy. That is both a basic goal, a strategic measure, and an immediate and long-term plan to win the war in Vietnam.

The content of the plan is to pacify the situation in the South after the co-initiation event within 18 months. The Army of the Republic of Vietnam, with the help of American military advisers, weapons aid, and military firepower will assume the role of controlling South Vietnam. Strategic hamlets were set up to manage the people, prevent them from being in contact with the NLF, thereby isolating the Liberation Army support from the peasantry.

On October 18, 1961, the U.S. Government sent Taylor and Rostow, two members of the National Security Council, to lead a delegation of military and civilian experts to South Vietnam to study and reassess the specific situation and draw conclusions on the spot and propose countermeasures. The delegation proposed three options of action for the U.S. as follows:

 Bringing into South Vietnam three divisions of American troops to defeat the Viet Cong.
 Symbolize some American combat troops "for the purpose of establishing the U.S. presence in South Vietnam" to lift the morale of the army and the Saigon government, which is falling sharply, and also to create favorable conditions for reinforcement of American troops when needed.
 Increase aid, weapons, war equipment and step up training for Saigon's armed forces to improve its combat power.

On November 3, 1961, Taylor's delegation sent to Washington the above report, which recommended a series of urgent measures to save the situation:

 Send administrative advisors to join the Saigon government apparatus to take necessary measures to improve the military and political intelligence network in this government and army.
 Open a large investigation in provinces throughout the South to quantify social, political, economic, intelligence, military, psychological factors... related to "counter-insurgency work" to provide more basis for more effective measures.
 Increase aid, weapons, equipment and training for security and militia forces so that this force can replace regular units on "ground" tasks (land preservation), creating favorable conditions for regular units to step up offensive and mobile operations.
 Assist the Saigon government in monitoring and controlling the seas and inland waterways by providing the necessary advisors, operators, and facilities for this mission.
 Reorganized and increased the staffing of the U.S. military aid advisory mission.
 Bringing into South Vietnam a special military force of 6,000 to 8,000 US troops to create a military presence, support military operations and, when needed, launch operations with offensive nature. In addition, the task force also serves as "a front-line element of US forces that would be brought in if the Pacific Commander-in-Chief or SEATO emergency plans were used".
 Increase aid to properly support the "expanded counter-insurgency" program.

In addition to the above general measures, the Taylor delegation also proposed a "Limited Participation Program" of the United States in the military field; sending to South Vietnam senior advisers to participate in government agencies and key ministries; establish a joint military inspection committee from the central government down to the military zones and provinces; substantially increase U.S. training personnel at all levels and in all military, administrative, economic, cultural, and social fields; deploying to South Vietnam engineering, logistics, and helicopter units within the framework of the U.S. military special forces that were previously proposed; pass. add US special forces teams to join Saigon special forces to strengthen the border area; stepped up covert offensive operations in North Vietnam and Laos, including air raids,

In order to implement the "Limited Participation Program", the Taylor delegation said that there should be a change in the mental and organizational status of the Military Aid Advisory Mission in South Vietnam. "This mission needs to be transformed from an advisory organization into something akin to - though not quite - an operational command post in a war zone." Moreover, in order to win, "the United States must become a limited participant in the war, on the one hand, must avoid the formalities and rituals of advising; on the other hand, it must avoid waging war on its own."

Deployment 
The Army of the Republic of Vietnam developed very quickly under this plan, within 18 months of its implementation:

 The army has 355,000 troops, of which 200,000 are regular forces equipped with modern equipment.
 257 fighter aircraft.
 346 armored vehicles.
 2,630 U.S. advisors active in the Army of the Republic of Vietnam and 8,280 US soldiers in special forces. When participating in the war, American advisors participated in commanding each infantry company.

In early 1962, the Military Assistance Command, Vietnam (MACV) was established by General Paul Harkins, replacing the Military Assistance Advisory Group (MAAG). by Lieutenant General Lionel C. McGarr.

By the end of 1962, there had been nearly 4,000 sweeping operations in service of the strategic hamlet program, including many large-scale sweeps such as the Sunrise Campaign, Binh Tay Campaign, Battle" Morning Star epidemic, and Autumn-Winter campaign. The goal of establishing 17,000 strategic hamlets with 10,000,000 inhabitants is carried out with top priority and considered "national policy". In 1962, there were 4,248 hamlets formed, by the end of 1962 and early 1963 there were 9,095 hamlets built to hold about 8,000,000 people, accounting for 40% of the population in the South.

Failure 
This plan was copied by the Liberation Army, fully collected immediately after the Đồng Khởi Movement, from which to take countermeasures.

After the clashes with the Liberation Army at the Battle of Ấp Bắc (January 1963), and Battle of Bình Giã (December 1964), the combat capacity of the Army of the Republic of Vietnam proved that it was not sufficient enough to carry out operations, "pacification" even in danger of being repelled. The Army of the Republic of Vietnam was destroyed by battalion, battle group, regiment, including the general reserve force, facing the inevitable collapse, the morale of the soldiers was exhausted. After the defeat at Ấp Bắc and Bình Giã, the U.S. saw that this army would collapse. Secret documents of the U.S. Department of Defense recorded that Washington's frustration with the military situation increased when the ARVN suffered a conspicuous defeat in the fierce battle of Bình Giã in the southeast of Saigon. According to the U.S. news agency UPI, in the two years 1963–1964 alone, there were 160,000 deserters, in the first six months of 1965 alone, another 87,000 deserted.

Officials in the U.S. administration all agreed that the situation in South Vietnam was deteriorating. The Saigon government fell into disarray with the territory under the control of the Republic of Vietnam increasingly shrinking. As stated by the First Secretary of the Vietnamese Workers' Party at that time, Lê Duẩn, "The United States found it impossible to defeat us in a special war".

In addition, the strategic hamlets - the backbone measure to secede the Liberation Army from the people did not comply with the plan: 2,895 out of the 6,164 hamlets were completely destroyed, the rest were demolished and repeated 5,000 times. By early 1964, with a total of 4,248 strategic hamlets in the South, 3,915 hamlets had been completely destroyed. In a report sent to President Johnson on March 16, 1964, U.S. Secretary of Defense McNamara gave an overview: "Of the land of 22 provinces (out of 44 provinces), the Viet Cong controlled up to 50% or Phuoc Tuy, Viet Cong control 80%; Binh Duong 90%; Hau Nghia 90%; Long An 90%; Dinh Tuong 90%; Kien Hoa 90%; An Xuyen (Ca Mau) 85%. Cay and Dinh Thuy, Binh Khanh, and Phuoc Hiep communes are "100% red"; over 900 communes as in the case of these three communes."

After the overthrow of Ngô Đình Diệm's government, from November 1963 to June 1965, the South had dozens of coups and purges. U.S. Ambassador Taylor had to say to the generals of the Republic of Vietnam: "We Americans are fed up with these coups. From now on, we Americans cannot support you anymore if you keep doing things like that."

Entering 1965, the risk of failure of the "special war" strategy put the U.S. in a difficult situation both in Vietnam and domestically. The American leadership proposes and implements a number of new strategic decisions. From this point, the Staley–Taylor Plan was no longer valid. On March 8, 1965, when U.S. Marines (3,500 soldiers) landed in Da Nang, the Staley-Taylor plan officially ended. The Vietnam War entered a new phase, when American soldiers directly participated in the war in Vietnam and implemented the Search and Destroy Strategy of the Local War.

Notes 

Vietnam War
1961 in South Vietnam
Battles and operations of the Vietnam War
Battles and operations of the Vietnam War in 1961
Campaigns of the Vietnam War
Military history of the United States during the Vietnam War